The 2012–13 Copa del Rey was the 3rd staging of the Copa del Rey de Futsal. The competition started on October 10, 2012 with the first round and will finish with the final on May 11, 2013. The final was held in Irun, Gipuzkoa, in the Polideportivo Artaleku with a 2,000-seats.

Barcelona Alusport won its third title in a row by defeating 6–3 ElPozo Murcia in the Final.

Calendar

Qualified teams
14 clubs of Primera División
12 clubs of Segunda División
18 clubs of Segunda División B

First round
The matches will be played on 9 and 10 October 2012.

All times are CEST.

|}

Matches

Second round
Second round draw took place on October 16 at 12:00 at RFEF headquarters. The second round draw includes all the winners from the first round plus all the Primera División teams and the remaining Segunda División teams who were exempted in the first round.

The matches will be played on 27 and 28 November 2012.

All times are CET.

|}

Matches

Final stages

Third round

Third round or round of 16 draw took place on December 4 at 12:00 at RFEF headquarters. The third round draw includes the winners from the second round which in summary are eight teams from Primera División, four from Segunda División and four from Segunda División B. At the same time was made the draw for quarterfinals and semifinals.

The matches will be played on 18 and 19 December 2012.

All times are CET.

Matches

Quarterfinals

Matches to be played on 15 & 16 January 2013, playing as home team the lowest ranked team in 2011–12 Primera División, (regular season standings).

All times are CET.

|}

Matches

Semifinals

First leg matches to be played on 19 & 20 March and second leg matches on 9 & 10 April.

All times are CET.

|}

Matches

1st leg

2nd leg

Final
The final will be played on 11 May at the Polideportivo Artaleku in Irun, Gipuzkoa, Basque Country.

Top scorers
Last updated: May 11. 

Source: own compilation''

See also
2012–13 Primera División de Futsal
2012 Copa de España de Futsal

References

External links
lnfs.es

Copa del Rey de Futsal seasons
Copa
Fut